Konstantinovsky (masculine), Konstantinovskaya (feminine), or Konstantinovskoye (neuter) is the name of several urban and rural inhabited localities (work settlements, settlements, villages, selos, and stanitsas) in Russia.

Urban localities
Konstantinovsky, Yaroslavl Oblast, a work settlement in Tutayevsky District of Yaroslavl Oblast

Rural localities
Konstantinovsky, Saratov Oblast, a settlement in Romanovsky District of Saratov Oblast
Konstantinovskoye, Kostroma Oblast, a village in Sumarokovskoye Settlement of Susaninsky District of Kostroma Oblast
Konstantinovskoye, Moscow Oblast, a selo under the administrative jurisdiction of the work settlement of Mikhnevo in Stupinsky District of Moscow Oblast
Konstantinovskoye, Stavropol Krai, a selo in Konstantinovsky Selsoviet of Petrovsky District of Stavropol Krai
Konstantinovskaya, Kotlassky District, Arkhangelsk Oblast, a village in Kharitonovsky Selsoviet of Kotlassky District of Arkhangelsk Oblast
Konstantinovskaya, Shenkursky District, Arkhangelsk Oblast, a village in Rovdinsky Selsoviet of Shenkursky District of Arkhangelsk Oblast
Konstantinovskaya, Kirov Oblast, a village in Ichetovkinsky Rural Okrug of Afanasyevsky District of Kirov Oblast
Konstantinovskaya, Krasnodar Krai, a stanitsa in Konstantinovsky Rural Okrug of Kurganinsky District of Krasnodar Krai
Konstantinovskaya, Stavropol Krai, a stanitsa under the administrative jurisdiction of the city of krai significance of Pyatigorsk, Stavropol Krai